The Shri Shankaracharya Institute of Professional Management and Technology (SSIPMT) Raipur is a unit of Shri Shankaracharya Technical Campus (SSTC), managed by Shri Gangajali Education Society (SGES), approved by All India Council for Technical Education (AICTE) and affiliated to Chhattisgarh Swami Vivekanand Technical University, Bhilai, and is named after Adi Shankaracharya. The college offers education in Bachelor of Engineering, Master of Engineering and MBA.

History 

The College, established in 2008, is the first Shankaracharya Group College in Raipur managed by Shri Gangajali Education Society.

Administration 
The Governing body comprises representatives of the Society, Nominees of Chhattisgarh Swami Vivekanand Technical University, Bhilai, Nominees of AICTE ; State Govt. The Director of the college is the ex-officio members secretary of the Governing Body.

Location 

Raipur  is the capital city of the state of Chhattisgarh, India. It is renowned as the education hub of Chhattisgarh, having many, particularly, engineering colleges, also Raipur has Indian Institute of Management Raipur and National Institute of Technology Raipur. The Swami Vivekananda Airport of the state capital Raipur is well connected to metros and major cities of India.
The railway station at Raipur is widely used for all national trains, as it has major train stoppages along the Howrah-Mumbai line.

Courses 

SSIPMT offers the following four-year undergraduate degree courses in the following branches 
  Computer Science and Engineering
  Electronics and Telecommunication                                     
  Information Technology.
  Mechanical Engineering.
  Civil Engineering.

The course is divided into eight semesters. The ordinances of CSVTU, are followed in respect of attendance, examination, rules for passing, award of degrees etc.

SSIPMT also offers following two-year postgraduate degree courses, in following specializations 
 Human Resources Management (Master of Business Administration)
 Marketing Management (Master of Business Administration)
 Systems Management (Master of Business Administration)
 Finance Management (Master of Business Administration)
 Production Management (Master of Business Administration)

About SSIPMT 

SSIPMT Raipur is an ISO 9001:2008 certified institution. WIPRO Mission 10X Learning Centre (MTLC) has been set up to groom students on latest technologies. The College has been giving exceptional State University results since its inception. The College has modern infrastructure with 400+ modern computer systems and expertise of conducting online tests and national level competitive examinations.

Departments 

SSIPMT has the following departments:
  Information Technology 
  Computer Science & Engineering
  Electronics & Telecommunication 
  Department of Mechanical Engineering 
  Master of Business Administration (MBA)
  Applied Physics
  Applied Chemistry
  Applied Mathematics
  Communication Skills
  Civil Engineering

Events & Conferences 

 ICI-SDSMT-2017 - "International Conference on Innovations & Sustainable Development in Sciences, Management & Technology" had been held at SSIPMT, during 25–26 March 2017.
 "SPSS Data Analysis Workshop" - "Introduction to SPSS for Data Analysis Workshop" was being held at SSIPMT on 25 March 2017.

Hostel 

SSIPMT offers separate hostels for boys and girls inside the College premises itself. Each room is furnished with cots, study tables, chairs and storage racks. Every effort is made to provide homely atmosphere for the hostellers. At the same time, they are required to strictly adhere to the rules and regulations laid by the institution.

See also 

 Shri Shankaracharya College of Engineering and Technology
 Shri Shankaracharya Engineering College
 Shri Shankaracharya Institute of Technology & Management
 Shri Gangajali Education Society
 Chhattisgarh Swami Vivekanand Technical University

References

External links 
 

Engineering colleges in Chhattisgarh
Education in Raipur, Chhattisgarh
Educational institutions established in 2008
2008 establishments in Chhattisgarh